KITI (1420 AM) is a radio station broadcasting in an oldies format. Licensed to Centralia, Washington, United States, it serves the Centralia-Chehalis area in western Washington. KITI airs news from ABC News Radio on the top of each hour.

External links

ITI
Oldies radio stations in the United States
Centralia, Washington
Radio stations established in 1977